Kinetica is a racing video game developed by Santa Monica Studio and published by Sony Computer Entertainment for the PlayStation 2. It was released in North America only on October 16, 2001. It is the debut game of Santa Monica Studio. It was the first game to use the Kinetica game engine which would later be used for the video games SOCOM U.S. Navy SEALs, God of War and God of War II. The game incorporates the use of SoundMAX audio technology by Analog Devices. An art book titled The Art of Kinetica was included with the game itself, containing artwork of the game's characters. In 2016, the game was re-released on PlayStation 4.

Gameplay
Kinetica is set in the future versions of Earth's major cities, outer-space, and some fictional locations in the Earth's distant future. Twelve racers compete while wearing "Kinetic Suits", which have wheels on the hands and feet, giving racers the appearance of motorcycles.

The goal is the same as any racing game: be the first to cross the finish line. There are fifteen tracks and three seasons in the game. Each season consists of four tracks that the player must obtain a certain place in to advance. Getting first place in every race in a season will unlock a bonus track, and getting first place in the bonus track will unlock both the default and alternate versions of one of the unlockable characters. In order to progress through the game, the player must obtain first, second, or third place in the first season races. In the second season, the player must place first or second place, while in the third season the player must win each race in first place to advance.

Scattered around the tracks are power-up crystals that come in yellow and purple colors. Collecting five yellow crystals will give the player a power-up, while getting one purple crystal automatically gives the player a power-up regardless of how many yellow crystals the player has collected. Characters can perform stunts on the ground and in the air to add to the boost meter to gain access to faster than normal speeds, though this meter can also be filled by getting one of the three boost power-ups from the power-up crystals.

Reception

Kinetica received "generally favorable reviews" according to the review aggregator website Metacritic. Louis Bedigian of GameZone praised the game, stating "it practically annihilates Extreme G3 and the last two F-Zero games released." Gary Whitta of Next Generation called it "An intriguing twist on a largely played-out genre, although the Autobots-style racers might turn some gamers off."

References

External links

2001 video games
Science fiction racing games
Multiplayer and single-player video games
PlayStation 2 games
PlayStation 2-only games
Sony Interactive Entertainment games
Video games developed in the United States
Santa Monica Studio games